After the Verdict is a 1924 novel by the English writer Robert Hichens. It was published in London by Methuen and in New York by George H. Doran. The novel was listed as a mystery and a romance.

Adaptation
In 1929 it was made into a silent film of the same title directed by Henrik Galeen and starring Olga Tschechowa and Warwick Ward. The film is considered lost as of 2021.

References

Bibliography
 Goble, Alan. The Complete Index to Literary Sources in Film. Walter de Gruyter, 1999.
 Vinson, James. Twentieth-Century Romance and Gothic Writers. Macmillan, 1982.

1924 British novels
Novels by Robert Hichens 
British novels adapted into films